Anootsara Maijarern (born 14 February 1986) is a Thai international footballer who plays as a defender.

International goals

Honours

International
 AFF Women's Championship  Winner (2): 2011, 2015
 Southeast Asian Games  Gold Medal (2): 2007, 2013

References

External links 
 
 
 

1986 births
Living people
2015 FIFA Women's World Cup players
Women's association football defenders
Anootsara Maijarern
Anootsara Maijarern
Footballers at the 2006 Asian Games
Footballers at the 2010 Asian Games
Footballers at the 2014 Asian Games
Anootsara Maijarern
Anootsara Maijarern
Southeast Asian Games medalists in football
Competitors at the 2007 Southeast Asian Games
Competitors at the 2013 Southeast Asian Games
Anootsara Maijarern
Anootsara Maijarern